John Albert Douglas (21 September 1868 – 3 July 1956) was a priest of the Church of England and a major figure in Anglican–Orthodox relations in the 20th century.

Douglas was a member of the Anglican and Eastern Churches Association and the Fellowship of Saint Alban and Saint Sergius and vicar of St Michael Paternoster Royal from 1933 to 1952. He had served previously, from 1909 to 1933, at St Luke's Church, Camberwell, in the Diocese of Southwark. He was the founder of The Nikaean Club.

Bibliography 

 
 
 
 
 
 
 
 
 
 
 "Introduction". In Matthew, A. F. The Teaching of the Abyssinian Church, as Set Forth by the Doctors of the Same. Translated by Matthew, A. F. London: Faith Press. 1936.

See also 

 Anglican and Eastern Churches Association

References

External links 
John Douglas

1868 births
1956 deaths
20th-century English Anglican priests
Anglo-Catholic clergy
Anglo-Catholic writers
English Anglo-Catholics
English male writers
People in Christian ecumenism